, also known as Chū-2 for short, is a Japanese light novel series written by Torako, with illustrations provided by Nozomi Ōsaka. The work won an honorable mention in the Kyoto Animation Award competition in 2010, leading the company to assume its publication starting in June 2011. The series follows a high school boy named Yūta Togashi, who tries to discard his embarrassing past grandiose delusions, until he meets a girl named Rikka Takanashi, who exhibits her own signs of chūnibyō syndrome. As their relationship progresses, Yūta and Rikka form a club called the Far East Magical Napping Society Summer Thereof with classmates Shinka Nibutani, Kumin Tsuyuri, and Sanae Dekomori, who each have their own unique delusional behaviors.

A 12-episode anime adaptation by Kyoto Animation aired in Japan between October 4 and December 19, 2012, with six six-minute Lite episodes streamed on YouTube. The anime is licensed by Sentai Filmworks for release in North America. An animated film was released in September 2013, and a second anime season, Love, Chunibyo & Other Delusions -Heart Throb-, aired between January and March 2014. A second animated film featuring a new story, Love, Chunibyo & Other Delusions! Take on Me was released in 2018.

Plot

Yūta Togashi is a boy who, during junior high school, suffered from "chūnibyō", believing that he possessed supernatural powers and calling himself the "Dark Flame Master", therefore alienating himself from his classmates. Finding his past embarrassing, Yūta attempts to start off high school where he does not know anyone, free from his old delusions. This proves to be difficult, however, as a delusional girl in his class, Rikka Takanashi, learns of Yūta's past and becomes interested in him.

As the plot progresses, Rikka becomes more attached to Yūta, who, despite finding her delusions irritating and embarrassing, accepts her. He helps Rikka with a number of things, including founding and maintaining her club and tutoring her. The club in question, the "Far-East Magical Napping Society – Summer Thereof", also includes current chūnibyō Sanae Dekomori; former chūnibyō Shinka Nibutani; and the constantly sleeping Kumin Tsuyuri. When Yūta joins Rikka on her summer vacation, Yūta learns that two years prior, Rikka's father, to whom she was very close, died unexpectedly due to a terminal illness, causing her to fall into her delusions.

Characters

 The narrator of the light novels, Yūta is a first-year high school student who used to be delusional, calling himself the "Dark Flame Master" while in junior high and becoming alienated from everyone as a result. He attempts to bury his past by enrolling in a high school far away from his junior high classmates. However, after encountering Rikka, his past delusions come back to haunt him. He ends up joining Rikka's club and becomes friends with Rikka's cohorts as well as school beauty Shinka Nibutani. He and Rikka eventually become closer and start dating. In the anime film, Yūta gives Rikka a ring to show "proof" that he will stay by her side. He and Satone Shichimiya were also classmates in junior high and she was the one who inspired him to become the "Dark Flame Master".

Rikka is Yūta's classmate and neighbor residing above Yūta's apartment. Despite being quite attached to Yūta, she is cautious of strangers and adopts a battle pose whenever she meets someone for the first time. Her fantasy weapon of choice is a frilly parasol which she wields as a sword. For her delusional operations, she often dresses in a mostly-black gothic dress. At school, she wears a uniform with a frilly skirt, long black knee socks, and shoes that sometimes function as roller shoes. She is also rather clumsy, often tripping over and forgetting things. The origin of her delusions come from her father's death three years prior, where she was forced to live with her father's family until she moved in with her sister. They also come from Yūta himself, when she saw Yūta in his delusional phase at the balcony above Yūta's apartment. They eventually become close and develop feelings for one another and start dating, but Rikka's delusions appear to keep their relationship from progressing. A running gag in the series is that she visits Yūta by climbing down a balcony with a rope.

 Shinka is Yūta's classmate who is one of the most popular girls in the class. She is the class representative and a member of the cheerleading club. She wears a hairclip on her bangs. In the anime series, when she learns Sanae is in possession of the Mabinogion, a blog penned by Shinka during her chūnibyō phase, she joins Rikka's school club in order to try and retrieve it, but gives up when she learns that Sanae has kept multiple backup copies. When out of the public eye, Shinka shows her true nature to be bit more bitter and easily irritable, particularly when dealing with Sanae, but they eventually care for each other and she's genuinely a kind-hearted person who loves and cares about her friends, and she will help them if needed. She later quits the cheerleading club to focus more on making herself popular.

 An anime original character, Kumin is a carefree girl who is a year above Yūta and the others. She loves sleeping and often carrying around a pillow (or many) with her wherever she goes. In one extreme case, she is even shown sleeping in a full futon on school grounds. Having been home-schooled before high school, she is very sheltered and conservative, lending her an old-fashioned ladylike demeanor which Makoto finds attractive. Her own "Nap Club" is integrated into Rikka's social group for lack of members. She earnestly attempts to understand Rikka and Sanae's delusional fantasies. She has a tendency to sleep-talk. She is also quite fond of cats and often naps curled up like a cat.

 An anime original character, Sanae is Rikka's best friend. She is a third-year junior high student who has very long blonde elastic twintails that often prove to be more of a hindrance than a help. Like Rikka, she is extremely delusional and often indulges in fantasy with her. However, unlike Rikka, she is a superb student who is at the top of her class and has already completed the entire junior-high mathematics curriculum. She owns several copies of a spell book which is the remaining evidence of Shinka's delusional days. She is often at odds with Shinka, whom she does not believe to be the real Morisummer. In the Japanese dub, she often ends her sentences with 'desu', emphasizing it to make it sound more like 'death'. She dislikes milk and dairy products, even though she will attempt to drink it in order to grow taller. She is aware that her delusions are nothing more than delusions. She comes from a very rich family and tends to behave normally around her classmates. She later promotes to the high school where Yūta and friends are studying.

 Makoto is Yūta's classmate who sits behind him and often analyzes the other girls in the class. He joins the Light Music Club so he could be with girls and attract their attention by carrying about his guitar, though he does not seem to have learned how to play it. Fond of his thick hair after being forced to wear it short for sports activities for the last three years, he is forced to have his head shaved once more when his notebook containing the "Cutie Poll" of the girls in his class is discovered. In the anime, he develops a crush on Kumin after she becomes fond of petting his buzz cut hair.

Kuzuha is Yūta's younger sister who is in the first year of junior high school. She is mature for her age.

Yumeha is Yūta's youngest sister, aged five. She finds Yūta's prior fantasy antics intriguing, often refers to them as "cool" and admires or idolizes Rikka.

Yūta and Rikka's homeroom teacher, who is often kind, if sometimes a little sadistic in teasing her students, particularly Rikka. She is called Nana-chan by Yūta and Rikka.

Satone was Yūta's junior high school classmate, first appearing in the second light novel and the anime's second season. She is depicted as having a cheerful, fun-loving personality. Although she considers Yūta to be her best friend, she ended up transferring schools without saying goodbye during their second junior high school year. She transferred to Shinka Nibutani's junior high school where they became close. She suffers from delusions and calls herself  and addresses Yūta with the nickname . Yūta and Shinka's delusions began with their admiration and mimicry of Satone's behavior. During her time with Yūta in junior high school, she developed feelings for him, but chose to stay as "Sophia Ring SP Saturn VII" and the "Magical Devil Girl" forever.

 Hideri is an upperclassman of Rikka and Yūta; she is a main character starting with the third light novel. She heads the Eccentric Drama Club.

An anime original character, Tōka is Rikka's older sister who supports her by working as a chef at a fine restaurant. She often has to put up with her younger sister's delusional antics, often punishing her by whacking her with a ladle. She is also seen to be extremely acrobatic and flexible, which she attributes to being a rhythmic gymnast when she herself was in high school. Rikka depicts her sister as a high priestess of evil and accuses Tōka of restraining her from her quest to reach the "Invisible Boundary Line". In one instance, she was playing house with Yūta's youngest sister Yumeha, but had a negative outlook where they divorced.

Kazari is Yūta's classmate from the novels, and the class idol. She was in second place in Makoto's ranking of the most beautiful girls in his school, although still remains the centre of attention. She had a close relationship with Shinka in junior high school.

Media

Light novels
The series began as a light novel series written by Torako, with illustrations by Nozomi Ōsaka. Torako entered the first novel in the series into the first Kyoto Animation Award contest in 2010, and it won an honorable mention in the novel category. Kyoto Animation published four volumes under their KA Esuma Bunko imprint from June 2011 to December 2017.

|}

Anime

A 12-episode anime television series adaptation, directed by Tatsuya Ishihara and produced by Kyoto Animation, aired in Japan between October 4 and December 19, 2012. Starting before the TV series' airing, a series of six original net animation shorts titled Love, Chunibyo & Other Delusions Lite were streamed weekly on YouTube between September 27 and November 1, 2012. The television series were released on six BD/DVD compilation volumes between December 19, 2012, and May 15, 2013. The volumes also contained bonus shorts titled . A seventh volume, containing an original video animation episode, another Depth of Field short and the Lite shorts, was released on June 19, 2013. The series has been licensed in North America by Sentai Filmworks and was streamed on Anime Network and currently airs on Hidive. Sentai Filmworks released the series on subtitled DVD in North America on May 27, 2014, followed by an English dubbed release on DVD and Blu-ray Disc on February 24, 2015. In Southeast Asia, it was broadcast through Animax Asia and premiered on June 2, 2014.

The opening theme is "Sparkling Daydream" by Zaq, and the ending theme is "Inside Identity" by Black Raison d'être (Maaya Uchida, Chinatsu Akasaki, Azumi Asakura and Sumire Uesaka). The single for "Sparkling Daydream" was released on October 24, 2012 and the single for "Inside Identity" on November 21, 2012.

An anime film titled , which retells the events of the first anime season from Rikka's perspective, was released in Japanese theaters on September 14, 2013, and was later released on Blu-ray Disc and DVD on February 19, 2014. Sentai Filmworks has licensed the film in North America.

A second anime television season, titled , aired in Japan from January 8 to March 26, 2014, and was simulcast by Crunchyroll. Madman Entertainment started streaming the series on January 7, 2014 on Madman's Screening Room in Australia and New Zealand. The opening theme is "Voice" by Zaq and the ending theme is "Van!shment Th!s World" by Black Raison d'être. The first of a second series of Lite episodes was released on YouTube on December 26, 2013. Animax Asia and Animax UK added the second season in early 2014. The second season has also been licensed by Sentai Filmworks, under the title Love, Chunibyo & Other Delusions -Heart Throb-. Sentai Filmworks released the second season on August 25, 2015. A Blu-ray set featuring the dubbed and subbed versions of both seasons was released on November 7, 2017. The second season has been licensed by Animatsu Entertainment in the United Kingdom. 

A second anime film, titled , continuing from the second season of the anime, premiered on January 6, 2018, as the finale of the series. The staff and cast from the original anime series returned to reprise their respective roles in the second film.

Following the acquisition of Crunchyroll by Sony Pictures Television, the parent company of Funimation in 2021, Love, Chunibyo & Other Delusions!, among several Sentai titles, was dropped from the service on March 31, 2022.

Notes

Works cited
  "LN" is shortened form for light novel and refers to a volume number of the Love, Chunibyo & Other Delusions light novels.
  "Ch." and "Vol." is shortened form for chapter and volume, and refers to a chapter or volume number of the Love, Chunibyo & Other Delusions manga.
  "Ep." and "S" is shortened form for episode and season, and refers to an episode number of the Love, Chunibyo & Other Delusions anime television series.

References

External links
Light novel official website 
Anime official website 
Kyoto Animation page: LC&OD, LC&ODRV, LC&ODHT, LC&ODTOM′
Sentai Filmworks page: LC&OD, LC&OD OVA, LC&ODRV, LC&ODHT, LC&ODHT OVA, LC&ODTOM
Madman Entertainment page: LC&ODCBR. LC&ODCDVD

2011 Japanese novels
2012 anime ONAs
2012 anime television series debuts
2013 anime ONAs
2013 anime OVAs
2014 anime television series debuts
Anime and manga based on light novels
Bandai Namco franchises
Japanese romance novels
KA Esuma Bunko
Kyoto Animation
Light novels
Romantic comedy anime and manga
Sentai Filmworks
Television shows based on light novels
Yonkoma